The Triple-A All-Star Game was an annual baseball game held from 1988 to 2019 between professional players from the affiliated Triple-A leagues of Minor League Baseball. These leagues were the International League (IL) and Pacific Coast League (PCL) from 1998 to 2019. Previously, the American Association competed along with the IL and PCL before it disbanded following the 1997 season. The 2020 game was cancelled along with the entire minor league season due to the COVID-19 pandemic. The 2021 game was postponed and not rescheduled after a delayed start to the season. There has been no announcement about its resumption in the future.

All-Star players were selected through a vote by team managers and general managers, members of the media, and fans. From the inaugural 1988 event through 1997, teams of American League-affiliated Triple-A All-Stars faced off against teams of National League-affiliated Triple-A All-Stars. During this period, six games were won by National League teams, and four were won by American League teams. From 1998 through 2019, the IL and PCL each fielded a team composed of players in their respective leagues. The International League won 12 games, while the Pacific Coast League won 10.

Traditionally, the game took place on the day after the mid-summer Major League Baseball All-Star Game. The game was meant to mark a symbolic halfway-point in the season (though not the mathematical halfway-point which, for most seasons, was usually one month prior). The Triple-A leagues shared a common All-Star break, with no regular-season games scheduled for two days before the All-Star Game itself. Some additional events, such as the All-Star Fan Fest and Triple-A Home Run Derby, took place each year during this break in the regular season.

History 
At a meeting of the three Triple-A leagues of Minor League Baseball in 1986, International League (IL) president Harold Cooper proposed establishing committees to find ways to improve their product. One result was the creation of the Triple-A All-Star Game. In August 1987, the American Association (AA), International League, and Pacific Coast League (PCL) announced plans to begin holding joint all-star games in 1988 which would occur the day after the annual Major League Baseball All-Star Game. The first was to be played at Pilot Field in Buffalo, New York, home to the IL's Buffalo Bisons. The host city would then alternate annually between cities in each Triple-A league.

Due to the odd number of leagues, it was decided that one team would be made up of All-Stars from American League (AL) affiliates and the other of players from National League (NL) affiliates, with each Triple-A team having at least one representative. Starting players were elected by voters in each Triple-A city, while reserve players were chosen by a committee of the three league presidents and representatives from Baseball America, which sponsored the game.

At the inaugural Triple-A All-Star game on July 13, 1988, in Buffalo, the AL All-Stars defeated the NL team, 2–1, before a sellout crowd of 19,500 people and a national television audience watching on ESPN. Ed Jurak (Tacoma Tigers, PCL) was selected as the first Triple-A All-Star Game Most Valuable Player after leading off the top of the ninth inning with a triple and then scoring the winning run on Bob Geren's (Columbus Clippers, IL) ground out. Another part of the All-Star festivities was the Triple-A Home Run Derby, a contest to see which player could hit the most home runs. The first, held the day before the 1988 game, was won by Columbus' Geren.

The AL-versus-NL format continued to be used through the 1997 Triple-A All-Star Game. In the final game to utilize this format, the AL affiliates defeated the NL affiliates, 5–3, at Sec Taylor Stadium in Des Moines, Iowa, home to the AA's Iowa Cubs, on July 9, 1997. All told, the National League won six Triple-A All-Star Games, and the American League won four.

The American Association ceased operations after the 1997 season. So in 1998, the teams were reorganized so that one consisted of International League All-Stars and the other of Pacific Coast League All-Stars. The first IL versus PCL match-up occurred on July 8, 1998, at Harbor Park in Norfolk, Virginia, home of the IL's Norfolk Tides, with the IL team winning, 8–4.

From 2006 to 2016, the winning league earned the distinction of having its league champion (determined at the end of the season) being given home team status for the Triple-A National Championship Game, a single game to determine a Triple-A champion in the postseason. This changed in 2017, when home team status began being awarded to the team from the league which hosted the championship game.

The most recent edition of the Triple-A All-Star Game was played on July 10, 2019, at Southwest University Park in El Paso, Texas, home to the PCL's El Paso Chihuahuas. The PCL won, 9–3, before 9,706 in attendance and a national television audience on MLB Network. Ty France (El Paso, PCL) and Eric Haase (Columbus, IL) were selected as the Top Stars (MVPs). Over 22 meetings, the International League won 12 Triple-A All-Star Games, and the Pacific Coast League won 10.

The start of the 2020 season was postponed due to the COVID-19 pandemic before ultimately being cancelled on June 30. This resulted in the cancellation of the 2020 game, which had been slated for PNC Field in Moosic, Pennsylvania, home of the IL's Scranton/Wilkes-Barre RailRiders.

In conjunction with Major League Baseball's restructuring of Minor League Baseball in 2021, the IL and PCL disbanded, and Triple-A teams were reorganized into the Triple-A East and Triple-A West. Opening Day for the 2021 season was postponed for nearly a month to temporarily eliminate commercial air travel and give players the opportunity to be vaccinated against COVID-19 before the season started. While the 2021 schedule originally included a three-day All-Star break, this was removed after the delayed start. The 2021 Triple-A All-Star Game, scheduled to be held at the Dell Diamond in Round Rock, Texas, home to the Triple-A West's Round Rock Express, was postponed and not rescheduled. In 2022, the Triple-A East and West were renamed the International League and Pacific Coast League, respectively, and they carried on the history of those leagues prior to reorganization. The 2022 Triple-A schedule includes a four-day All-Star break from July 18–21, but there has been no indication that the All-Star Game will resume.

Structure 

In the 2019 Triple-A All-Star Game, the most recently held, each league's roster consisted of 33 players, though the actual number of players on gameday may have been less due to call-ups, injuries, or players choosing not to participate. Thirteen players were elected for each team through a vote by team managers and general managers, members of the media, and fans. Twenty additional players were selected by each league office to fill out their rosters. One goal of adding these additional players was to ensure every Triple-A team was represented.

The game itself consisted of a single nine-inning game to determine a champion. The league in which the host city competed was considered the home team, and the other team was designated as the visiting team. Designated hitters batted in place of pitchers. The only All-Star game to ever go beyond the prescribed nine innings was the 2004 event. Rules restricted the game from going beyond 10 innings, but the International League scored in the bottom of the 10th inning, avoiding a tie game as the result.

Historically, players wore their respective team's uniforms. Players on the home team wore their club's white home uniforms, while players on the away team wore their club's gray road uniforms. Often, a patch depicting the game's logo was sewn onto their jerseys and/or caps. One exception was in 2017, when players wore league-specific jerseys paired with the appropriate home/road pants and their respective team's cap.

The game was umpired by a four-man crew, with one umpire behind home plate and the others covering each base. Two of the umpires worked in the IL, while two worked in the PCL. Positions rotated each year, such that IL umpires were assigned to home plate and second base in even years, and PCL umpires manned those positions in odd years.

Results

American League vs. National League (1988–1997)

International League vs. Pacific Coast League (1998–2019)

Cancelled games (2020–2021)

Awards 

The Most Valuable Player (MVP) awards at the Triple-A All-Star Game went by various names. One player was selected in the inaugural 1988 contest for the SportsTicker "Star of Stars" Award. From 1989 through 1997, the award was bestowed upon one player from each Triple-A league. For 2004, this award was renamed the TSN "Star of the Game" Award. From 2005 to 2016, it was known as the MiLB.com "Top Star" Award. From 2017 to 2019, it was the Bush's Beans "Top Star" Award.

Additional awards were given out to honor the best overall performance and/or best pitching performance from 2000 to 2008. From 2000 to 2003, two players were honored as the Maurice Lacroix/Lou Gehrig Players of the Game—one as "Player of the Game" and one as "Pitcher of the Game." In 2004, one player was selected as the Dodge Most Valuable Player. From 2005 to 2007, this award has given out as the Bank of America Most Valuable Player Award. The Bank of America Most Valuable Pitcher Award was given in 2008.

The teams with the most MVP winners (excluding additional awards from 2000 to 2008) were the Buffalo Bisons (IL), Oklahoma City RedHawks (PCL), and Richmond Braves (IL) with five MVPs each. The Columbus Clippers (IL), Durham Bulls (IL), Indianapolis Indians (IL), Las Vegas 51s (PCL), and Syracuse Chiefs (IL) are tied for second place with four MVPs each. The only player to win more than one regular MVP award is Luis Lopez, who won in 1994 with Richmond and in 1995 with Buffalo.

1988–1997

1998–2019

Notable All-Stars

As of the 2021 Major League Baseball All-Star Game, of the more than 1,200 players that participated in the Triple-A All-Star Game, 112 have also been selected for the MLB All-Star Game. These players are:

 Ozzie Albies
 Sandy Alomar Jr.
 Yonder Alonso
 Jesus Aguilar
 Garret Anderson
 Bronson Arroyo
 Jay Bell
 Ronnie Belliard
 José Berríos
 Hank Blalock
 Aaron Boone
 Bret Boone
 Jackie Bradley Jr.
 Jeromy Burnitz
 Jeff Conine
 Ron Coomer
 Scott Cooper
 Joey Cora
 Jesse Crain
 Carl Crawford
 Joe Crede
 Jake Cronenworth
 Nelson Cruz
 Michael Cuddyer
 Josh Donaldson
 Justin Duchscherer
 Adam Dunn
 Ray Durham
 Adam Duvall
 Damion Easley
 Edwin Encarnación
 Alcides Escobar
 Johnny Estrada
 Carl Everett
 Steve Finley
 Darrin Fletcher
 Carlos García
 Brian Giles
 Álex González
 Juan González
 Alex Gordon
 Dan Haren
 Corey Hart
 Matt Harvey
 Todd Helton
 Liam Hendriks
 Ken Hill
 Orlando Hudson
 Todd Hundley
 Jason Isringhausen
 Gregg Jefferies
 Derek Jeter
 Lance Johnson
 Adam Jones
 Chipper Jones
 Howie Kendrick
 Ian Kinsler
 Jason Kipnis
 Andrew Kittredge
 Ryan Klesko
 Paul Konerko
 Bryan LaHair
 Paul Lo Duca
 Kenny Lofton
 Javy López
 Mark Loretta
 Mike Lowell
 Ryan Ludwick
 Ketel Marte
 Starling Marte
 Pedro Martínez
 Ramón Martínez
 Tino Martinez
 Andrew McCutchen
 Nate McLouth
 Devin Mesoraco
 Justin Morneau
 Brandon Moss
 Edward Mujica
 Wil Myers
 Denny Neagle
 Eduardo Núñez
 José Offerman
 Magglio Ordóñez
 Joc Pederson
 Jhonny Peralta
 Mike Piazza
 Jorge Polanco
 Rick Reed
 Henry Rodríguez
 Taylor Rogers
 José Rosado
 Gary Sánchez
 Joe Saunders
 Marco Scutaro
 Richie Sexson
 George Sherrill
 Alfonso Soriano
 Geovany Soto
 Ed Sprague
 Chris Taylor
 Jim Thome
 Mark Trumbo
 Chase Utley
 Greg Vaughn
 Daniel Vogelbach
 Joey Votto
 Michael Wacha
 Bob Wickman
 Bernie Williams
 Kirby Yates
 Dmitri Young

Home Run Derby 

The Triple-A Home Run Derby was an annual home run hitting contest usually held two days before the Triple-A All-Star Game. Though the rules changed from year to year, the 2019 iteration featured eight players—four of the top home-run-hitters from each league—competing to see who could hit the most home runs within a time limit. The single-elimination tournament consisted of three rounds. The first two rounds determined which of the four hitters from each league would compete in the final round against the winner from the other league.

Fifteen contests were won by Pacific Coast League players, while 13 were won by International League players, two by American Association players, and one by a retired player.
Rob Stratton (2003 and 2007) and Chad Huffman (2009 and 2018) were the only participants to win the derby twice. Juan González is the only player to win the Triple-A Home Run Derby and the Major League Baseball Home Run Derby. He won the Triple-A version in 1990 and the MLB version in 1993.

Winners

Broadcasts 

Each Triple-A All-Star Game was broadcast on radio across various regional and national sports networks. The 1988 and 1989 events were televised on ESPN. It was carried on Prime Network from 1990 to 1992. The 1993 game was not televised, but it returned to SportSouth/Prime Network in 1994. ESPN2 broadcast the game from 1995 to 2009. It aired on MLB Network from 2010 to 2019.

See also 

 Double-A All-Star Game

References 
Specific

General

External links 

 Triple-A All-Star Game (Archived)
 All-Star Game coverage at MiLB.com (Archived)

All-star games
American Association (1902–1997)
Baseball competitions in the United States
International League
Minor league baseball competitions
Pacific Coast League
Recurring sporting events established in 1988
Recurring sporting events disestablished in 2021